1978 in philosophy

Events 
 The Philosopher's Annual is established.

Publications 
 Critical Inquiry, Special Issue: On Metaphor (Volume 5, Number 1)
 Ted Cohen, "Metaphor and the Cuiltivation of Intimacy" (Excerpt)
 Paul de Man, "The Epistemology of Metaphor" (Excerpt)
 Donald Davidson, "What Metaphors Mean" Excerpt)
 Wayne C. Booth, "Metaphor as Rhetoric: The Problem of Evaluation" (Excerpt)
 Karsten Harries, "Metaphor and Transcendence" (Excerpt)
 David Tracy, "Metaphor and Religion: The Test Case of Christian Texts" (Excerpt)
 Richard Shiff, "Art and Life: A Metaphoric Relationship" (Excerpt)
 Howard Gardner and Ellen Winner, "The Development of Metaphoric Competence: Implications for Humanistic Disciplines" (Excerpt)
 Paul Ricoeur, "The Metaphorical Process as Cognition, Imagination, and Feeling" (Excerpt)
 Afterthoughts on Metaphor
 W.V. Quine, "A Postscript on Metaphor" (Excerpt)
 Don R. Swanson, "Toward a Psychology of Metaphor" (Excerpt)
 Karsten Harries, "The Many Uses of Metaphor" (Excerpt)
 Wayne C. Booth, "Ten Literal 'Theses'" (Excerpt)
 Critical Responses
 I. Margaret Schaefer, "Psychoanalysis and the Marionette Theater: Interpretation Is Not Depreciation" (Excerpt)
 Heinz Kohut, "A Reply to Maragaret Schaefer" (Excerpt)
 In the end
 Kenneth Burke, "A Critical Load, Beyond That Door..." (Excerpt)
 John McDowell, "On ‘The Reality of the Past", in Christopher Hookway and Philip Pettit, eds., Action and Interpretation (CUP, Cambridge), pp. 127-44
 John McDowell, "Are Moral Requirements Hypothetical Imperatives?", Aristotelian Society Supplementary Volume lii, 13-29
 John McDowell, "Physicalism and Primitive Denotation", Erkenntnis, xiii, pp. 131–52
 Mary Midgley, Beast and Man: The Roots of Human Nature. London: Routledge and Kegan Paul
 Hilary Putnam, Meaning and the Moral Sciences. London: Routledge and Kegan Paul
 Alan Gewirth, Reason and Morality
 Hannah Arendt, The Life of the Mind (published posthumously in 1978)
 John Perry, A Dialogue on Personal Identity and Immortality

Births

Deaths 
 January 14 - Kurt Gödel (born 1906)

Philosophy
20th-century philosophy
Philosophy by year